Miss France is a French national beauty pageant, held annually in December. The competition was first held in 1920, and has been organized continuously since 1947. The trademark for the pageant is owned by the company Miss France SAS, and is a subsidiary of Endemol Shine France. The competition is aired on TF1.

Miss France was first organized in 1920, under the name La plus belle femme de France, and was held for one additional year before being abandoned until 1927. That year, the competition was rebranded into Miss France, and was held annually until 1940, due to World War II. In 1947, following the end of the war, the competition was revived and has been held annually since. In 1954, Guy Lévy founded the Miss France Committee to organize the competition. Geneviève de Fontenay took over the Miss France Committee in 1981, until departing in 2007. Following the departure of de Fontenay, Sylvie Tellier served as the national director of Miss France until August 2022, when she was replaced by Cindy Fabre. In October 2021, Alexia Laroche-Joubert was announced as the new president of the Miss France Committee, working alongside Tellier and later Fabre.

Contestants of Miss France must meet a number of eligibility requirements and first win a regional title which qualifies them for the national competition, representing their region. A number of these regions also organize local competitions corresponding with cities and departments within the region, which must be won first before one can compete in the regional competition. The winner of Miss France resides in Paris during her year of reign in a rent-free apartment, in addition to winning a number of additional prizes and sponsorship deals while receiving a monthly salary. Typically, the winner represents France at either Miss Universe or Miss World, while her first runner-up competes at the other pageant.  In some instances, the predecessor of the reigning titleholder would compete at the other pageant or the two would switch years in order to avoid any scheduling conflicts between their assigned international pageant and the next Miss France competition.

The current Miss France is Indira Ampiot, who was crowned on 17 December 2022 at Miss France 2023. She had previously been crowned Miss Guadeloupe 2022, and is the fourth woman from Guadeloupe to win the title.

History
Miss France was first organized in 1920, under the name La plus belle femme de France. The competition was founded by journalist Maurice de Waleffe, who chose to have the winner be decided by French filmgoers. After more than 1,700 women applied for the competition, 49 finalists were chosen. The competition was held over the course of several weeks, with filmgoers being given a ballot with seven women, and asked to select their favorite. Agnès Souret was selected as the inaugural winner. The following year, the competition was held again, with Pauline Pô winning the competition. However, La plus belle femme de France was later abandoned after 1921.

Six years later the competition was revived under the name Miss France, with a new format organized by Robert and Jean Cousin. Miss France continued to be held annually until 1940, when World War II disrupted entertainment events. The competition later resumed in 1947, following the end of the war, and has been held annually since then. In 1986, the competition was aired live on TF1, becoming the first edition of Miss France to be broadcast live on national television.

Osez le féminisme, a French feminist organization, sued Miss France and its parent company, Endemol Production, in 2021 for sexist and discriminatory regulations. The lawsuit argues that the contestants in the pageant should be considered employees of the competition, thereby forbidding Miss France and Endemol from engaging in discrimination. In October 2021, Alexia Laroche-Joubert was announced as the new president of the Miss France Committee, working alongside Sylvie Tellier, the national director. In August 2022, Tellier was reported to have resigned her position as national director of Miss France, and was replaced by Cindy Fabre. Tellier will continue to serve in an advisory role with the organization, until her departure at the conclusion of Miss France 2023.

Contestants
Each year, contestants are chosen through a series of regional pageants held throughout metropolitan and overseas France in the summer and autumn before the national competition. Over time, the regions represented at Miss France have varied slightly. The following 31 regional pageants currently send contestants to Miss France:

Miss Alsace
Miss Aquitaine
Miss Auvergne
Miss Brittany
Miss Burgundy
Miss Centre-Val de Loire
Miss Champagne-Ardenne
Miss Corsica
Miss Côte d'Azur
Miss Franche-Comté
Miss French Guiana
Miss Guadeloupe
Miss Île-de-France
Miss Languedoc
Miss Limousin
Miss Lorraine
Miss Martinique
Miss Mayotte
Miss Midi-Pyrénées
Miss New Caledonia
Miss Nord-Pas-de-Calais
Miss Normandy
Miss Pays de la Loire
Miss Picardy
Miss Poitou-Charentes
Miss Provence
Miss Réunion
Miss Roussillon
Miss Rhône-Alpes
Miss Saint Martin and Saint Barthélemy
Miss Tahiti

The regional competitions are organized by regional committees, and contestants must reside or attend school in the region they choose to represent. Regional committees have their own discretion as to how they wish to field candidates for the regional competitions. Some choose to organize a number of local competitions corresponding to cities or departments within the region, while others use closed casting processes. Public voting is used to select winners of both regional pageants and the national competition. The winner of the national competition subsequently receives a number of prizes, including a rent-free apartment in Paris, sponsorship deals, and a monthly salary.

Rules and eligibility
In order to compete in Miss France, contestants must meet the following eligibility requirements:

Contestants must:
Be female or transgender female and of French nationality through birth or naturalization.
Be above age 18 on 1 November of the year of the competition.
Have a clean criminal record.

Contestants must not:
Have had her image exploited in a manner that could be incompatible or pose an obstacle to the organizers' rights.
Have received cosmetic surgery or use appearance-altering products such as wigs or colored contact lenses. 
Have ever posed partially or completely nude, including after the competition as well.
Have associated with political or religious propaganda while a regional titleholder.

The pageant's code of ethics also requires that contestants not engage in smoking or public alcohol consumption. Failure to comply with pageant rules carries a fine of 5,000 Euro. 

Prior to Miss France 2023, contestants also could not have been married, divorced, or widowed; have children or have been pregnant; be above the age of 24 on 1 November of the year of the competition; or have visible tattoos or non-ear piercings.

Recent titleholders

Gallery

Winners by region

Notes

References

External links
 Passion Miss 
 Miss France
  Official site
 http://www.lempimissit.suntuubi.com 
 Official Maldives partner page for 2011
 http://passionmiss.xooit.fr/index.php  (Site for fans, in French)
 La vérité tirée du chapeau ("The truth pulled out of the hat", in French)

 
French awards
France